Mayday is a ghost town in La Plata County, Colorado, United States. It was named for the Mayday Mine.

Geography
Mayday is located at  (37.350554, -108.076741).

See also

 List of ghost towns in Colorado

References

External links

 Mayday - Colorado Ghost Town at GhostTowns.com

Ghost towns in Colorado